Hemidactylus angulatus is a species of gecko. It is found in central and western Africa, as well as introduced to Cape Verde, Hispaniola (the Dominican Republic and Haiti), Puerto Rico, and Cuba in the Caribbean, and Ecuador and Colombia in South America.

References

Hemidactylus
Reptiles described in 1854
Lizards of the Caribbean
Lizards of Africa